The Apache Kid is a 1930 cartoon short distributed by Columbia Pictures and features Krazy Kat. The film is the character's 149th film.

Plot
In a tavern, Krazy is playing the piano while his spaniel girlfriend is sitting on it and singing. After spending a few moments by that instrument, they stood up and do the Apache dance. Suddenly, a tiger came by and grabs the spaniel, taking her faraway. Though the kidnapper flees in a horse, Krazy still chooses to run after on foot.

Krazy follows the tiger's trail into a sewer. Little did he know that the tiger and the spaniel are in a secret lair, and the entrance to that place is already shut. Desperately wanting to be released and see her boyfriend again, the spaniel weeps in the couch. In this, the tiger decides to cheer her up with a song and dance. While the captor is trying to entertain, Krazy finds an opening to the secret lair and goes in. Krazy finally confronts the tiger, and the two guys decided to settle things in a knife battle. Following a number of exchanges, the tiger is knocked cold. Krazy and the spaniel are reunited.

Spaniel girlfriend
Krazy's spaniel girlfriend makes one of her earliest appearances in this short, therefore becoming one of the primary cast not originating from the comic strip. She would then replace Ignatz Mouse as Krazy's supporting character, and even appearing in the title cards from 1930 to 1933.

Availability
Columbia Cartoon Collection: Volume 1.

See also
 Krazy Kat filmography

References

External links
The Apache Kid at the Big Cartoon Database
 

1930 films
American black-and-white films
Krazy Kat shorts
Columbia Pictures short films
1930 animated films
1930s American animated films
American animated short films
Animated films about dogs
Films about tigers
Columbia Pictures animated short films
1930 short films
Screen Gems short films